Mixed odontogenic tumor may refer to:

 Ameloblastic fibroma
 Ameloblastic fibro-odontoma
 Odontoma